Payton Sandfort (born July 12, 2002) is an American college basketball player for the Iowa Hawkeyes of the Big Ten Conference.

Early life and high school
Sandfort grew up in Waukee, Iowa and attended Waukee High School, where he played basketball and golf. He averaged 19.8 points, 8.7 rebounds, and 4.0 assists as a junior. Sandfort was named the Iowa Basketball Coaches Association 4A Player of the Year after averaging 16.6 points, 7.7 rebounds, and 3.1 assists during his senior season. He also helped Waukee to a state championship in golf as a senior. Sandfort was rated a three-star recruit and committed to play college basketball at Iowa over offers from Stanford, Utah, Minnesota, Drake, Air Force, and Loyola University Chicago.

College career
Sandfort served as a role player off of the bench for the Iowa Hawkeyes as a freshman. He played in 34 games and finished the season averaging five points and 1.9 rebounds per game. Sandfort grew one inch between his freshman and sophomore years. He entered his sophomore season as the Hawkeyes' starting shooting guard. Sandfort was moved to the bench due to poor shooting. At the end of the regular season he was named the Big Ten Conference Sixth Man of the Year.

Career statistics

College

|-
| style="text-align:left;"| 2021–22
| style="text-align:left;"| Iowa
| 34 || 0 || 10.5 || .418 || .366 || .938 || 1.9 || .6 || .1 || .1 || 5.0
|-
| style="text-align:left;"| 2022–23
| style="text-align:left;"| Iowa
| 32 || 7 || 20.7 || .398 || .346 || .875 || 4.0 || 1.4 || .6 || .2 || 10.0
|- class="sortbottom"
| style="text-align:center;" colspan="2"| Career
| 66 || 7 || 15.4 || .405 || .353 || .889 || 2.9 || 1.0 || .4 || .2 || 7.4

Personal life
Sandfort's younger brother, Pryce, is currently committed to play basketball at Iowa.

References

External links
Iowa Hawkeyes bio

2002 births
Living people
American men's basketball players
Basketball players from Iowa
Small forwards
Iowa Hawkeyes men's basketball players
People from Waukee, Iowa